The second FAI World Grand Prix 2007 was a gliding Grand Prix at the Omarama airfield in New Zealand during December 19 - December 24. Was the second Gliding Grand Prix race to take place in New Zealand.

Summary

Overall results

Classification

Qualifying

Race 1 - 19.12.2007

Race 2 - 20.12.2007

Race 3 - 21.12.2007

Race 4 - 23.12.2007

Race 5 - 24.12.2007

Notes 
 Weather and track condition:
 Spectator Count:
 Practice:
 Race 1:
 Race 2:

Gliding competitions
2007 in air sports
2007 in New Zealand sport
Gliding in New Zealand
International sports competitions hosted by New Zealand
Aviation history of New Zealand